Scaphitidae  is a family of extinct cephalopods belonging to the family of heteromorph ammonites (suborder Ancyloceratina). There is a possible fossil record of them being the last ammonites with fossils dating to the Danian of the Paleocene in Denmark, The Netherlands, The US and Turkmenistan.

Genera
Scaphitidae Gill, 1871
Subfamily Otoscaphitinae Wright, 1953
Yezoites Yabe, 1910
Subfamily Scaphitinae Gill, 1871
Acanthoscaphites Nowak, 1911
Clioscaphites Cobban, 1951
Discoscaphites Meek, 1870
Eoscaphites Breistroffer, 1947
Hoploscaphites Nowak, 1911
Indoscaphites Spath, 1953
Jeletzkytes Riccardi, 1983
Ponteixites Warren, 1934
Rhaeboceras Meek, 1876
Scaphites Parkinson, 1811
Trachyscaphites Cobban & Scott, 1964
Subfamily Incertae sedis
Worthoceras Adkins, 1928

References

 
Ammonitida families